1,8-Diazafluoren-9-one (DFO) is an aromatic ketone first synthesized in 1950. It is used to find fingerprints on porous surfaces. It makes fingerprints glow when they are lit by blue-green light.

DFO reacts with amino acids present in the fingerprint to form highly fluorescent derivatives.  Excitation with light at ~470 nm results in emission at ~570 nm.

References

External links
 RCMP report on 1,8-diazafluoren-9-one

Ketones
Forensic chemicals
Nitrogen heterocycles
Heterocyclic compounds with 3 rings